In geometry, the gyroelongated pentagonal birotunda is one of the Johnson solids. As the name suggests, it can be constructed by gyroelongating a pentagonal birotunda (either  or the icosidodecahedron) by inserting a decagonal antiprism between its two halves.

The gyroelongated pentagonal birotunda is one of five Johnson solids which are chiral, meaning that they have a "left-handed" and a "right-handed" form. In the illustration to the right, each pentagonal face on the bottom half of the figure is connected by a path of two triangular faces to a pentagonal face above it and to the left. In the figure of opposite chirality (the mirror image of the illustrated figure), each bottom pentagon would be connected to a pentagonal face above it and to the right.

See also
Birotunda

External links
 
 

Johnson solids
Chiral polyhedra